Kimberley Alpine Resort is a ski resort in southwestern Canada, located in Kimberley, British Columbia.

The ski season commonly starts in mid-December and runs until early April. 

The resort maintains 80 runs (with 20% beginner, 42% intermediate, and 38% advanced trails) and five lifts: a high-speed quad chairlift (the North Star Express), a triple chair (the Easter), a double chair (the Tamarack), a T-bar (the Owl) and a magic carpet, leading to an hourly lift capacity of 6,452. 

Management
The ski resort is operated by Resorts of the Canadian Rockies Inc., which also owns Fernie Alpine Resort, Nakiska, Mont Sainte-Anne, and Stoneham; the latter two are back east in Quebec.

References

External links
Ski Kimberley

Ski areas and resorts in British Columbia
East Kootenay